The 1953 Chicago White Sox season was the team's 53rd season in the major leagues, and its 54th season overall. They finished with a record of 89–65, good enough for third place in the American League, 11.5 games behind the first place New York Yankees.

Offseason 
 October 16, 1952: Hank Edwards and Willy Miranda were traded by the White Sox to the St. Louis Browns for Joe DeMaestri and Tommy Byrne.
 January 27, 1953: Joe DeMaestri, Ed McGhee and Eddie Robinson were traded by the White Sox to the Philadelphia Athletics for Ferris Fain and Bob Wilson (minors).

Regular season

Season standings

Record vs. opponents

Opening Day lineup 
 Nellie Fox, 2B
 Ferris Fain, 1B
 Minnie Miñoso, LF
 Vern Stephens, 3B
 Jim Rivera, CF
 Sam Mele, RF
 Chico Carrasquel, SS
 Red Wilson, C
 Saul Rogovin, P

Notable transactions 
 September 1, 1953: Neil Berry was selected off waivers by the White Sox from the St. Louis Browns.

Roster

Player stats

Batting 
Note: G = Games played; AB = At bats; R = Runs scored; H = Hits; 2B = Doubles; 3B = Triples; HR = Home runs; RBI = Runs batted in; BB = Base on balls; SO = Strikeouts; AVG = Batting average; SB = Stolen bases

Pitching 
Note: W = Wins; L = Losses; ERA = Earned run average; G = Games pitched; GS = Games started; SV = Saves; IP = Innings pitched; H = Hits allowed; R = Runs allowed; ER = Earned runs allowed; HR = Home runs allowed; BB = Walks allowed; K = Strikeouts

Farm system

Notes

References 
 1953 Chicago White Sox at Baseball Reference
 

Chicago White Sox seasons
Chicago White Sox season
Chicago White